Cornelli "Nelli" Antoinette Hariëtte Cooman (born 6 June 1964) is a former Dutch athlete of Surinamese origin. At the 60 metres, she is two-time World indoor champion, six-time European indoor champion and former world record holder, running 7.00 secs in 1986. She also won 19 national titles.

Cooman grew up in Suriname in a family together with four sisters and one brother. When she was eight, the family moved to Rotterdam in the Netherlands. She started to play soccer and soon got the nickname "Miss Pele". At sixteen, she was discovered to be a very good sprinter during a sporting event at school; thus she began a career in athletics. Three months later, she competed in the European Junior Championships in Utrecht and finished seventh in the 100 m sprint. At seventeen, she won the silver medal in the National Championships. After graduating secondary school she turned professional with Henk Kraaijenhof as trainer.

During her time as a professional athlete from 1984 to 1995 she was twice world indoor champion in the 60 m (1987 and 1989), and six times European indoor champion. At the 1986 European Indoor Championships she won in a time of 7.00 seconds, setting a world record. Because of that achievement she was elected Dutch Sportswoman of the year. Her world record lasted until February 1992 and still stands as national record. Cooman took part twice in the Summer Olympics for the Netherlands: in 1988 in the 100 metres and 4 × 100 m relay and in 1992 in 100 metres.

In 1995, Cooman ended her career as a professional athlete.

Achievements

Trivia
Since 1997 the Nelli Cooman Games are organised in the city of Stadskanaal. At first these games were only for youth-category competitors but they grew to be a national A-status KNAU (Royal Dutch Track and Field Union) event. Cooman is the 'honorary chairwoman' of this event.

Dutch singer Gerard Cox wrote a song about Nelli Cooman to a tune by Stevie Wonder.

References

External links

 Nelli Cooman Games

1964 births
Living people
Sportspeople from Paramaribo
Dutch female sprinters
Olympic athletes of the Netherlands
Surinamese emigrants to the Netherlands
Athletes (track and field) at the 1988 Summer Olympics
Athletes (track and field) at the 1992 Summer Olympics
European Athletics Championships medalists
World Athletics Championships athletes for the Netherlands
World Athletics Indoor Championships winners
Athletes from Rotterdam
Olympic female sprinters